Lah Farakh or Lah Frakh may refer to:
Lah Farakh-e Mushemi
Lah Frakh Melleh Namdaran